Kafaran castle is a historical castle located in Raz and Jargalan County in North Khorasan Province, The longevity of this fortress dates back to the Early and middle centuries of post-Islamic historical periods .

References 

Castles in Iran